Tyrone K. McGriff Sr. (January 13, 1958 – December 9, 2000) was an American football guard who played in the National Football League (NFL) with the Pittsburgh Steelers for three seasons. He then played three seasons in the United States Football League (USFL) and was a member of the 1983 USFL champions as a starting guard for the Michigan Panthers, for whom he also played in 1984 before playing the 1985 season with the Memphis Showboats. He was Mr. Irrelevant, as the last pick (333rd overall) in the 1980 NFL Draft. McGriff died in 2000 of a heart attack while in the employed as director of the Gifford Youth Activity Center in Vero Beach, Florida.  McGriff was survived by his two children, April and Tyrone McGriff Jr., and wife, Barbara Rollins McGriff.

Tyrone McGriff played football at Florida A&M University, where he made all-conference and preseason All-American. In 1996, McGriff Sr. was inducted into the College Football Hall of Fame as part of a large group of previously overlooked players.

Head coaching record

College

Notes

References

External links
 
 

1958 births
2000 deaths
American football offensive guards
Bethune–Cookman Wildcats football coaches
Florida A&M Rattlers football coaches
Florida A&M Rattlers football players
Grambling State Tigers football coaches
Memphis Showboats players
Michigan Panthers players
Pittsburgh Steelers players
Tennessee State Tigers football coaches
High school football coaches in Florida
College Football Hall of Fame inductees
People from Melbourne, Florida
People from Vero Beach, Florida
Coaches of American football from Florida
Players of American football from Florida
African-American coaches of American football
African-American players of American football
20th-century African-American sportspeople